This list of prehistoric bryozoans is an attempt to create a comprehensive listing of all genera that have ever been included in the bryozoa which are known from the fossil record. This list excludes purely vernacular terms. It includes all commonly accepted genera, but also genera that are now considered invalid, doubtful (nomina dubia), or were not formally published (nomina nuda), as well as junior synonyms of more established names, and genera that are no longer considered bryozoans. Naming conventions and terminology follow the International Code of Zoological Nomenclature, as indicated.

A
Acanthocella
Acanthoceramoporella
Acanthocladia
Acanthoclema
Acanthodesia
Acantholaminatus
Acanthopora
Acanthoporella
Acanthoporidea
Acanthotrypa
Acanthotrypina
Acoscinopleura
Acrogenia
Actinopora
Actinotaxia
Actinotrypa
Actinotrypella
Actisecos
Adenifera
Adeona
Adeonella
Adeonellopsis
Admiratella
Aechmella
Aegyptopora
Aeolopora
Aetea
Aetomacladia
Aggregopora
Aimulosia
Aisenvergia
Akatopora
Alderina
Allantopora
Allonema
Alternifenestella
Altshedata
Aluverina
Alveolaria
Alwynopora
Alysidota
Amalgamoporous
Amalgamoprus
Amathia
Ammatophora
Amphiblestrella
Amphiblestrum
Amphimorsoniella
Amphiporella
Amplexopora
Amsassipora
Amurodictya
Anaphragma
Anaptopora
Anarthropora
Anastomopora
Andriopora
Angelopora
Anguisia
Anisotrypa
Anisotrypella
Annectocyma
Annunziopora
Anolotichia
Anomalotoechus
Anornithopora
Anotopora
Antropora
Aostipora
Apatotervia
Apertostella
Aplousina
Apsendesia
Arachnidid
Arachnidium
Arachnoidella
Arachnopusia
Araxopora
Arborocladia
Archaeofenestella
Archaeomeson
Archimedes
Arcticopora
Arctipoora
Argopora
Armillopora
Artchedella
Arthroclema
Arthropoma
Arthrostyloecia
Arthrostylus
Arthrotrypa
Ascodictyon
Ascopora
Ascoporella
Asperopora
Aspidopora
Aspidostoma
Assatkinella
Astralochoma
Astrovidictya
Astroviella
Astroviellina
Atacama (see Plesiothoa)
Atactopora
Atactoporella
Atactoporidra
Atactotoechus
Atagma
Atelesopora
Athrophragma
Atractosoecia
Attinopora
Auchenopora
Australofenestella
Australopolypora

B
Bactrellaria
Bactridium
Bactropora
Baculopora
Bajolla
Balantiostoma
Balticopora
Balticoporella
Balticoporellina
Banastella
Baptopora
Bascomella
Bashkiriella
Basslederella
Bathosella
Bathystomella
Batopora
Batostoma
Batostomella
Batostomellina
Batrachopora
Beania
Beisselina
Beisselinopsis
Belorussipora
Berenicea
Biavicularium
Bicavea
Bicorbis
Bicornifera
Bicoronipora
Bicrisia
Bicrisina
Bidiastopora
Bifaxaria
Bifissurinella
Biflabellaria
Biflustra
Bimuropora
Biovicella
Biselenaria
Bisidmonea
Bitectipora
Bitubigera
Bivestis
Bobiesipora
Boreas
Boreasina
Botryllopora
Bracebridgia
Brachysoecia
Braiesopora
Brestopora
Brydonella
Bryocryptella
Bubnoffiella
Buffonella
Buffonellodes
Buria
Buskia
Buskopora
Bythopora
Bythotrypa

C
Caberea
Caberoides
Calacanthopora
Calamotrypa
Callocladia
Callopora
Calloporella
Calloporina
Callotrypa
Calopora
Calpensia
Calpidopora
Calvetina
Calvina
Canalipora
Canda
Canupora
Canutrypa
Capillapora
Cardiarachnidium
Cardioecia
Carinifer
Carinodictya
Carinophylloporina
Carydiopora
Cassianopora
Castanopora
Casteropora
Catenariopsis
Catenicella
Cava
Cavaria
Cavarinella
Cavernella
Ceata
Ceidmonea
Cellaria
Cellarinella
Cellarinidra
Cellepora
Celleporaria
Celleporella
Celleporina
Cellulipora
Centronea
Ceramella
Ceramophylla
Ceramopora
Ceramoporella
Ceriocava
Ceriopora
Cerioporella
Cervella
Chainodictyon
Championodictya
Champlainopora
Chaperia
Characodoma
Charixa
Chartecytis
Chasmatopora
Chasmatoporina
Chasmazoon
Chazydictya
Cheethamia
Cheilohorneropsis
Cheilonella
Cheilopora
Cheiloporina
Cheilotrypa
Chelidozoum
Chilopora
Chisma
Chlidoniopsis
Chondraulus
Choristopetalum
Chorizopora
Christinella
Cianotremella
Cillia
Cinctipora
Circibiopora
Cladodictya
Clathropora
Clausa
Clausotrypa
Clavicava
Claviporella
Clavisparsa
Clavitubigera
Cleidochasma
Clinopora
Cliocystiramus
Cliotrypa
Clithriellum
Clonopora
Clypeina
Codonellina
Coelocaulis
Coeloclemis
Coelocochlea
Coelopora
Coelospiropora
Coleopora
Collapora
Collarina
Colletosia
Collura
Columnotheca
Condranema
Conescharellina
Conopeum
Conotubigera
Constellaria
Cookobryozoon
Copidozoum
Corbulipora
Cornuticella
Coronidmonea
Corymbopora
Corymboporella
Corynostylus
Corynotrypa
Coscinella
Cosciniopsis
Coscinium
Coscinoecia
Coscinopleura
Coscinotrypa
Costazia
Costula
Cothurnicella
Cranosina
Craspedopora
Craspedoporina
Crassalina
Crassicellepora
Crassimarginatella
Crassodiscopora
Crassohornera
Crateropora
Crepidacantha
Crepipora
Crepis
Crescis
Cribella
Cribellopora
Cribrendoecium
Cribrilaria
Cribrilina
Cricodictyum
Crisia
Crisidia
Crisidmonea
Crisiella
Crisina
Crisinella
Crisiona
Crisisina
Crisulipora
Crownopora
Crustopora
Cryptoglena
Cryptostomella
Cryptosula
Ctenopora
Cubifenestella
Cucullipora
Cuneatopora
Cupuladria
Cuvilliera
Cyclicopora
Cyclocites
Cyclocolposa
Cyclopelta
Cycloperiella
Cyclophaenopora
Cyclopora
Cycloporella
Cyclotrypa
Cylindropora
Cyphonella
Cyphotrypa
Cyrtopora
Cystiramus
Cystisella
Cystitrypa
Cystodictya
Cystomeson
Cystoporella
Cystostictoporus
Cytis

D
Dacryonella
Dacryopora
Dacryoporella
Dakaria
Decurella
Decurtaria
Defrancia
Defranciopora
Dekayella
Dekayia
Dendroecia
Dentalitrya
Dentiporella
Desmatelesia
Desmediaperoecia
Desmeplatioecia
Desmepora
Diacanthopora
Diamesopora
Diancopora
Dianulites
Diastoporina
Diazipora
Dibunostoma
Diceratopora
Dichospiropora
Dichotrypa
Dicranopora
Dictuonia
Dictyoretmon
Didymosella
Dightonia
Dimorphocella
Dimorphocellaria
Dimorphostylus
Dionella
Diplobeisselina
Diplocava
Diploclema
Diplodesmepora
Diplopetalopora
Diplopholeous
Diploporaria
Diplorula
Diplosolen
Diplostenopora
Diplotresis
Diplotrypa
Discocytis
Discofascigera
Discoflustrellaria
Discoporella
Discosella
Discosparsa
Discotruncatulipora
Discotrypa
Discotrypina
Discotubigera
Discovibracella
Dishelopora
Disporella
Distansescharella
Distefanella
Disteginopora
Ditaxia
Ditaxipora
Ditaxiporina
Dittopora
Dittosaria
Diversipora
Duncanoclema
Duvergiera
Dybowskiella
Dybowskites
Dyoidophragma
Dyscritella
Dyscritellina
Dysnoetocella
Dysnoetopora

E
Echinocava
Eichwaldictya
Elaphopora
Elea
Electra
Eliasopora
Ellisina
Ellisinidra
Emballotheca
Enallopora
Encicellaria
Enoplostomella
Ensiphragma
Ensipora
Entalophora
Entalophoroecia
Entomaria
Eodyscritella
Eofistulipora
Eoheteropora
Eohippotha
Eohornera
Eopachydictya
Eoscrupocellaria
Eosemicoscinium
Eostenopora
Eostenoporella
Epiactinotrypa
Eridocamplyus
Eridopora
Eridotrypa
Eridotrypella
Eridotrypellina
Erinella
Erkosonea
Escharella
Escharicellaria
Escharifora
Escharina
Escharipora
Escharoides
Escharopora
Esthoniopora
Esthonioporina
Esthoniporella
Etherella
Eucheilopora
Eucratea
Eulyra
Euritina
Europora
Eurydictya
Eurystomella
Eurystrotos
Eurythyrhombopora
Euspilopora
Evactinopora
Evactinostella
Exechonella
Exfenestella
Exidomonea
Exochella
Exochoecia

F
Fabifenestella
Fasciculinopora
Fasciculipora
Fascigera
Fascipora
Favicella
Favositella
Fenestella
Fenestellata
Fenestepora
Fenesteverta
Fenestralia
Fenestrapora
Fenestrellina
Fenestrulina
Figularia
Filicava
Filicea
Filicrisia
Filicrisina
Filifascigera
Filiramoporina
Filisparsa
Filites
Fischerella
Fissuricella
Fistulamina
Fistulicanta
Fistuliphragma
Fistulipora
Fistuliporella
Fistuliporidra
Fistuliramus
Fistulocladia
Fistulotrypa
Flabellopora
Flabellotrypa
Flexifenestella
Floridina
Floridinella
Flustra
Flustrella
Flustrellaria
Foraripora
Foricula
Francopora
Frondipora
Frurionella
Fungella
Fusicellaria

G
Galeopsis
Ganiella
Gargantua
Gastropella
Gaudryanella
Geinitzella
Geisopora
Gemellaria
Gemellipora
Gemelliporella
Gemelliporidra
Gemelliporina
Geminella
Gephyrophora
Gephyrotes
Gigantopora
Gilmouropora
Girtyopora
Girtyoporina
Glauconomella
Globulipora
Glossotrypa
Glyptopora
Goldfussitrypa
Goniocladia
Goniocladiella
Goniotrypa
Gortanipora
Goryunovia
Grammanotosoecia
Grammascosoecia
Grammella
Grammothoa
Graptodictya
Graptopora
Graptoporella

H
Hagenowinella
Haimeina
Hallopora
Halloporina
Haplocephalopora
Haplooecia
Haplopoma
Haplopomella
Haplotrypa
Hapsidopora
Harmeriella
Haswellia
Hayasakapora
Helenopora
Helicopora
Heliotrypa
Helixotionella
Heloclema
Helopora
Hemeschara
Hemibashkirella
Hemicellaria
Hemicosciniopsis
Hemicyclopora
Hemieridotrypa
Heminematopora
Hemiphlactella
Hemiphragma
Hemiseptella
Hemismittina
Hemistylus
Hemitrypa
Hemitrypella
Hemiulrichostylus
Hennigopora
Herentia
Hernodia
Herpetopora
Hesperopora
Heteractis
Heterocella
Heteroconopeum
Heterocrisina
Heterohaplooecia
Heteropora
Heteroporella
Heterotrypa
Hexacanthopora
Hexagonella
Hexaporites
Hexites
Hiantopora
Hinaclema
Hincksina
Hincksipora
Hinganella
Hinganotrypa
Hippadenella
Hippaliosina
Hipperechonella
Hippiopora
Hippodiplosia
Hippoexechonella
Hippolyrula
Hippomenella
Hippomonavella
Hippophylactella
Hippopleurifera
Hippopodina
Hippopodinella
Hippoporella
Hippoporidra
Hippoporina
Hippopozoon
Hipposera
Hippothoa
Hippozeugosella
Hoeverella
Holoporella
Holostegopora
Homalostega
Homoeosolen
Homotrypa
Homotrypella
Hoplitaechmella
Hoplocheilina
Hopora
Hormerella
Hornera
Houzeauina
Hubeipora
Hunanopora
Hyalotoechus
Hyphasmopora
Hyporosopora
Hystricopora

I
Iberostomata
Ichnopora
Ichthyorachis
Idioclema
Idiotrypa
Idmidronea
Idmonea
Idmonella
Idmoneoides
Ignotifenestella
Ignotrypa
Ikelarchimedes
Immergentia
Inconobotopora
Infundibulipora
Insignia
Intrapora
Inversiula
Ipmorella
Iraidina
Isotrypa
Isphairamella

J
Jaculina
Jordanopora

K
Kalevipora
Kallodictyon
Kalvariella
Kankopora
Kasakhstanella
Kazarchimedes
Kelestoma
Kenella
Kielanopora
Kielcepora
Kingopora
Kionidella
Klaucena
Kleidionella
Koldophos
Kronothoa
Kuarnbyella
Kukersella
Kunradina
Kyarnbyella
Kylonisa
Kysylschinopora

L
Labioporella
Lacerna
Lacrimula
Lagarozoum
Lagenipora
Lagenosypho
Lagonoecia
Lagynopora
Laminopora
Lamottopora
Lamtshinopora
Lanarkopora
Lanceopora
Lanopora
Latereschara
Laterocavea
Laterocea
Lateroflustrellaria
Laterotecatia
Laterotubigera
Laxifenestella
Leeporina
Leioclema
Leiosella
Leiosoecia
Lekythionia
Lekythoglena
Lekythopora
Lepralia
Lepralina
Leptocheilopora
Leptopora
Leptotrypa
Leptotrypella
Levifenestella
Lichenalia
Lichenopora
Lichenotrypa
Liguloclema
Linotaxis
Lioclemella
Lioporida
Liripora
Lobopora
Lobosoecia
Locularia
Loculipora
Lophoclema
Lopholepsis
Loxophragma
Lunaferamita
Lunularia
Lunulites
Lyrocladia
Lyropora
Lyroporella
Lyroporidra

M
Macropora
Macroporina
Magnea
Magnederella
Mamillopora
Manzonella
Marcusodictyon
Marcusopora
Margaretta
Marginaria
Marquetta
Marssoniella
Marssonopora
Mastigophora (see Herentia)
Mastigophorella
Matherocladia
Matheropora
Matsutrypa
Maychella
Maychellina
Meandropora
Mecynoecia
Mediapora
Medisemicoscinium
Meekopora
Meekoporella
Megacanthopora
Megacanthoporina
Melicerita
Melicerita
Meliceritella
Meliceritites
Meliceritites
Membranipora
Membraniporella
Membraniporidra
Membraniporina
Membrendoecium
Meniscopora
Mesenteripora
Mesonea
Mesonopora
Mesostomaria
Mesotrypa
Mesotrypina
Metadictya
Metastenodiscus
Metelipora
Metracolposa
Metradolium
Metrarabdotos
Metrocrypta
Metroperiella
Microcampylus
Microecia
Micropora
Microporella
Microporina
Minilya
Minussina
Mirifenestella
Mitoclema
Mitoclemella
Mojczatrypa
Mollia
Mongoloclema
Mongolodictya
Monoceratopora
Monocerina
Monodesmopora
Monoporella
Monotrypa
Monotrypella
Monsella
Monticellaria
Monticulipora
Moorephylloporina
Morozovapora
Morozoviella
Morphasmopora
Mosathoa
Moyanopora
Moyerella
Mucronella
Multicavea
Multicrescis
Multifascigera
Multigalea
Multiphragma
Multisparsa
Multitubigera
Multizonopora
Mumiella
Murengoloclema
Murinopsia
Myagropora
Myriapora
Myriozoum
Mystriopora

N
Nannopora
Nekhoroshoviella
Neliella
Nellia
Nemacanthclema
Nemacanthopora
Nemataxidra
Nemataxis
Nematifera
Nematopora
Nematoporella
Nematotrypa
Neoeridocampilus
Neoeridotrypella
Neoretenoa
Neoreteporina
Neorhombopora
Neotrematopora
Nephropora
Neuropora
Neuroporella
Nevianopora
Newportopora
Nicholsonella
Nicklesopora
Niigaella
Nikiforopora
Nikiforovella
Nipponstenopora
Notamia
Notoplagioecia
Nudonychocella
Nudymiella

O
Oanduella
Oanduellina
Obliquostoma
Ochetosella
Ochetosellina
Odonotrypa
Odontionella
Oeciophylloporina
Ogbinopora
Ogiva
Ogivalia
Ogivalina
Oligotopora
Omalosecosa
Oncousoecia
Onychocella
Onychocellaria
Opisthornithopora
Orbignyella
Orbignyopora
Orbipora
Orbitulipora
Orectodictya
Orthopora
Osburnostylus
Osculipora
Osthimosia
Otionella
Otopora
Ottoseetaxis

P

Pachycraspedon
Pachydera
Pachydictya
Pachystomaria
Pachyteichopora
Pachythecella
Pakridictya
Palaeocoryne
Palaeocrisidia
Paleoatactoechus
Paleschara
Palmicellaria
Pamirella
Pancheilopora
Papillalunaria
Parachasmatopora
Paracrescis
Parafenestalia
Parafenestella
Paralhederella
Paralioclema
Parametelipora
Paranicklespora
Paraseptopora
Parasmittina
Parastenodiscus
Paratrachytoechus
Paratretocycloecia
Paravinella
Parellisina
Parleiosoecia
Parmularia (see Lanceopora)
Parobeisselina
Partretocycloecia
Parvohallopora
Pasythea
Patellipora
Patenaria
Patsyella
Paucipora
Pavobeisselina
Pavolunuites
Pedrogopora
Pelmatopora
Penetrantia
Pennipora
Penniretepora
Perfodiastopora
Pergensella
Perigastrella
Peripora
Periporosella
Peristomella
Permofenestella
Permoheloclema
Permoleioclema
Permopora
Peronopora
Persiopora
Pesnastylus
Petalopora
Petaloporella
Petalostegas
Petalotrypa
Petigopora
Petraliella
Phacelopora
Phaenophragma
Phaenopora
Phaenoporella
Pharopora
Phidolopora
Phoceana
Pholidopora
Phonicosia
Phormopora
Phractopora
Phractoporella
Phragmophera
Phragmopora
Phragmotrypa
Phrynopora
Phylactella
Phylactellipora
Phyllodictya
Phylloporina
Pictatella
Pileotrypa
Pinacotrypa
Pinegopora
Pinnatopora
Pinnctoporella
Pithodella
Plagioecia
Plagiosmittia
Planicellaria
Platonea
Platyglena
Plethopora
Plethoporella
Pleurolyrula
Pleuronea
Pleuroschizella
Pliophloea
Pnictopora
Pnictoporopsis
Podljassopra
Polyascosoecia
Polyascosoeciella
Polycephalopora
Polyceratopora
Polycylindricus
Polyfenestella
Polypora
Polyporella
Polyspinopora
Polyteichus
Porella
Poriceata
Poricella
Poricellaria
Porina
Porismittina
Porometra
Poropeltarion
Poroplagioecia
Praesemicoscinium
Prasopora
Prasoporina
Prattia
Prenantia
Primarella
Primorella
Prismopora
Proavella
Proboscina
Proboscinopora
Prodromopora
Profistulipora
Promediapora
Prophyllodictya
Prosotopora
Prosthenoecia
Prostomaria
Protocrisina
Protoretepora
Proutella
Pseudoascopora
Pseudobatostomella
Pseudobeisselma
Pseudofrondipora
Pseudohornera
Pseudoisotrypa
Pseudolunulites
Pseudonematopora
Pseudopachydictya
Pseudoseptopora
Pseudoseriopora
Pseudostege
Pseudostictoporella
Pseudotervia
Pseudothyracella
Pseudounitrypa
Psilosecos
Psilosolen
Pterocella
Pteropora
Ptilocella
Ptilodictya
Ptilofenestella
Ptilofenestella
Ptiloporella
Ptiloporina
Ptilotrypa
Ptilotrypina
Ptylopora
Puellina
Puncturiella
Pushkinella
Pustulopora
Pycnobasis
Pycnopora
Pyricavea
Pyripora
Pyriporella
Pyriporopsis
Pyrulella

Q
Qilianopora
Quadricellaria
Quadriscutella
Quadrisemicoscinium
Quasitrilaminopora

R
Radicipora
Radiocavaria
Radiofascigera
Radiopora
Radiotrypa
Radulopora
Ralfina
Ralfinella
Ramia
Ramipora
Ramiporalia
Ramiporella
Ramiporidra
Ramofilisparsa
Ramphonotus
Rarifenestella
Realeksella
Rectifenestella
Rectonychocella
Reginella
Reptadeonella
Reptaria
Reptescharipora
Reptoceritites
Reptoclausa
Reptofascigera
Reptolunites
Reptomultelea
Reptomulticava
Reptomulticlausa
Reptomultisparsa
Reptonodicava
Retecava
Retelea
Retenoa
Retepora
Reteporellina
Reteporidra
Reteporina
Reticrisina
Reticulipora
Reussia
Revalopora
Revalotrypa
Revssirella
Rhabdomeson
Rhabdopora
Rhabdotometra
Rhacheopora
Rhagasostoma
Rhammatopora
Rhamphostomella
Rhebasia
Rhenanerella
Rhiniopora
Rhinopora
Rhinoporella
Rhipidiopora
Rhombocladia
Rhombopora
Rhomboporella
Rhombotrypa
Rhombotrypella
Rimulostoma
Ripisoecia
Romancheina
Ropalonaria 
Rosacilla
Rosseliana
Rotoporina
Rozonovia
Ruzhencevia
Ryhopora

S
Saevitella
Saffordotaxis
Sagenella
Salairia
Salicornaria
Samaria
Sandalopora
Sardesonina
Savignyella
Scalaripora
Scenellopora
Sceptropora
Schischatella
Schiscjkatella
Schismopora
Schismoporella
Schistacanthopora
Schizaropsis
Schizemiella
Schizemiellopsis
Schizobathysella
Schizobrachiella
Schizomavella
Schizoporella
Schizoporellopsis
Schizoretepora
Schizorthosecos
Schizosmittina
Schizostomella
Schizotheca
Schizotrema
Schizotremopora
Schulgina
Scorpiodina
Scruparia
Scrupocellaria
Scuticella
Seelandia
Seguenziella
Selenaria
Selenopora
Semicea
Semicinctipora
Semiclausa
Semicoscinium
Semicytella
Semicytis
Semielea
Semieschara
Semiescharinella
Semifascipora
Semifenestella
Semifungella
Semihaswellia
Semilaterotubigera
Semimulticavea
Seminodicrescis
Semiopora
Semitubigera
Septatopora
Septopora
Serietubigera
Seriopora
Serpentipora
Sertella
Setosella
Setosellina
Setosinella
Shishoviclema
Shylgapora
Sibiredictya
Silenella
Silenopora
Silvaseptopora
Sinoatactoechus
Sinupetraliella
Siphodictyum
Siphoniotyphlus
Siphonoporella
Skylonia
Smittina
Smittinella
Smittipora
Smittistoma
Smittoidea
Solenonychocella
Solenophragma
Sonninopora
Sparsicavea
Sparsicytis
Sparsiporina
Spathipora
Spatiopora
Speotrypa
Sphaerogypina
Sphaeropora
Sphaerulobryozoon
Sphenella
Sphragiopora
Spinicharixa
Spinofenestella
Spinopora
Spira
Spirentolophora
Spirillopora
Spiropora
Spiroporina
Spridmonea
Staffordotaxis
Stamenocella
Stathmepora
Staurosteginopora
Steginopora
Steginoporella
Stellahevaformis
Stellatodictya
Stellipora
Stellocavea
Stenocladia
Stenodiscus
Stenophragmidium
Stenopora
Stenoporella
Stenopsella
Stenopsis
Stenosipora
Stephanodesma
Stephanollona
Stephanosella
Stephanotrema
Steraechmella
Stereotoechus
Stichocados
Stichomicropora
Stichopora
Stichoporina
Stichtostega
Stictocella
Stictopora
Stictoporella
Stictoporellina
Stictoporina
Stictotrypa
Stigmatella
Stigmatoechos
Stolonicella
Stomachetosella
Stomatopora
Stomatoporina
Stomatoporopsis
Stomhypselosaria
Streblascopora
Streblocladia
Streblopax
Streblotrypa
Streblotrypella
Stromatotrypa
Strongylopora
Strophipora
Strotopora
Stylopoma
Subretepora
Sulcocava
Sulcoretepora
Supercytis
Sylonika
Synaptacella
Synnotum
Synocladia
Synocladiopsis
Syringoclemis
Systenostoma

T
Tabulipora
Tabuliporella
Taeniocellana
Taeniodictya
Taeniopora
Taenioporella
Taenioporina
Talmontipora
Tamaroclema
Taphrostoma
Taractopora
Tarphophragma
Tavayzopora
Tebitopora
Tegella
Teichopora
Telopora
Terebellaria
Terebripora
Tervia
Tessaradoma
Tetragonoecia
Tetraplaria
Tetrapora
Tetratoechus
Teuchopora
Thalamoporella
Thamniscus
Thamnotrypa
Thecatia
Theonoa
Tholopora
Thoracopora
Thornipora
Thyracella
Timanodictya
Timanotrypa
Trachytoechus
Trataucladia
Trematella
Trematooecia
Trematopora
Trematoporina
Tremocoscinopleura
Tremogasterina
Tremolyrula
Tremopora
Tremoschizodina
Tremotoichos
Trepocryptopora
Trepostomina
Treptopora
Tretocycloecia
Tretonea
Tretosina
Tricephalopora
Tricolpopora
Tricornicella
Trigonodictya
Trigonopora
Trilophopora
Triplopora
Triplozooecia
Triporula
Triznella
Trochiliopora
Trochopora
Trochosodon
Tropidopora
Truncatula
Truncatulipora
Trypematella
Trypocella
Trypostega
Tshokrakopora
Tubescharina
Tubigera
Tubigerina
Tubiporella
Tubitrabecularia
Tubucella
Tubucellaria
Tubulipora
Tubulitrypa
Turbicellopora
Tylopora

U
Ubaghsia
Uldzapora
Ulrichostylus
Ulrichotrypa
Ulrichotrypella
Umbonula
Umbrellina
Uniavicularia
Unicrisia
Unicytis
Unitrypa
Unitubigera
Uralotrypa
Utgaardostylus
Utropora

V
Vasalemmapora
Velumella
Verella
Verminaria
Veroclema
Vesicularia
Vibracella
Vibracellina
Vibraculina
Vincularia
Vinella
Virgatella
Virgocella
Vittaticella
Voigtella
Voigtia
Voigtiella
Voigtopora
Volgia
Volnovachia
Volviflustrellaria
Voorthuyseniella

W
Wassypora
Watersipora
Wawalia
Wilbertopora
Wjatkella
Wolinella
Woodipora
Worthenopora
Wyseotrypa

X
Xaveropora
Xenotrypa

Y
Yangotrypa
Ybseloscoecia
Yichangopora
Yunnanopora

Z
Zagorsekia
Zigzagopora
Zlambachia
Zonopora
Zozariella

References

 
Prehistoric bryozoan genera